John Howard Buchanan is a freelance journalist, and was a fringe Republican candidate in the 2004 Presidential election. Buchanan was previously based in Florida and lives in rural Georgia.

Buchanan discovered documents related to Union Banking Corporation's business dealings with Fritz Thyssen, the Nazi industrialist who broke with the Nazis after Kristallnacht in 1938 and fled to Switzerland during World War II; together with Stacy Michael, Buchanan wrote an article about it for the New Hampshire Gazette, accusing one of the directors of the bank, Prescott Bush, of dealing with the Nazis.

He e-mailed a number of threats against journalists and media outlets who refused to publish his theories, saying that he would expose the journalists as "traitors to the truth." Buchanan was arrested and charged with aggravated stalking in Miami, Florida, over a dispute of how best to publicize his theories, but the charges were dropped in 2004.

During his presidential campaign, he often referred to himself as "the 9/11 Truth Candidate".
He also opposed the 2003 Iraq war.  A United Press International reporter called his campaign "unhinged."
With 836 votes, Buchanan finished in eighth in the 2004 New Hampshire primary, in which incumbent George W. Bush was not seriously contested.

Buchanan also mulled a 2004 run with the Reform Party. The major contenders for the nomination were Ted Weill and Ralph Nader, the latter of whom was ultimately chosen.

Buchanan served as editor of the Blairsville, GA  Union Sentinel for 13 weeks in 2005.   The Atlanta Journal-Constitution  said:

See also
 Full list of candidates in the U.S. presidential election, 2004

References

External links
 John Buchanan, the 9/11 Truth Candidate
 John Buchanan Road Blog

Georgia (U.S. state) Republicans
9/11 conspiracy theorists
Candidates in the 2004 United States presidential election
21st-century American politicians
People with bipolar disorder
American conspiracy theorists
Living people
Year of birth missing (living people)